Patrick Blossier (born 23 September 1946) is a French cinematographer. He contributed to more than seventy films since 1976.

Selected filmography

References

External links
 

1946 births
Living people
Cinematographers from Paris